Sainte-Suzanne may refer to a number of saints named Suzanne, or:

Places in France
 Sainte-Suzanne, Ariège, a municipality in the Ariège department
 Sainte-Suzanne, Doubs, a municipality in the Doubs department
 Sainte-Suzanne, Mayenne, a municipality in the Mayenne department
 Sainte-Suzanne, Pyrénées-Atlantiques, a village in the municipality of Orthez, Pyrénées-Atlantiques department
 Sainte-Suzanne, Réunion, a municipality on Réunion Island
 Sainte-Suzanne-sur-Vire, a municipality in the Manche department

Places in Haiti
 Sainte-Suzanne, Nord-Est, commune in the Nord-Est department of Haiti

People
 Gilles-Joseph-Martin Bruneteau Saint-Suzanne (1760–1830), a French Revolutionary and Napoleonic general
 Jean-Chrysostôme Bruneteau de Sainte-Suzanne (1773–1830), French Revolutionary and Napoleonic general

Other uses
 Sainte-Suzanne river, a river feeding the Niagara Falls on Réunion Island